Protein deltex-2 also known as E3 ubiquitin-protein ligase DTX2 is an enzyme that in humans is encoded by the DTX2 gene.

DTX2 functions as a ubiquitin E3 ligase in conjunction with the E2 enzyme UBCH5A.

References

Further reading

External links 
 

Transcription factors